Karel is a surname that is derived from the given names Carl and Karl. Notable people with the surname include:

Surname
Eva Karel (fl. mid 1960s – 1970s), Swiss slalom canoeist
 Frank Karel (1935–2009), American health advocate
 Jan Karel (fl. 1970s), Austrian-Swiss slalom canoeist
 John C. Karel (1873–1938), American politician
 Jozef Karel (1922–2005), Slovak football player and coach
 L. Albert Karel (1875–1965), American politician
 Marian Karel (born 1944), Czech sculptor 
 Rudolf Karel (1880–1945), Czech composer
 William Karel (born 1940), French film director and author

See also

Kariel
Michael J. Karels

Notes